Andaluces Levantaos was an Andalusian-based electoral alliance formed by Más País, Andalucía por Sí (AxSí) and Andalusian People's Initiative (IdPA) to contest the 2022 Andalusian regional election. The alliance aimed at representing ecologist, feminist and social democratic voters.

Most of the alliance's members integrated themselves within the larger Por Andalucía alliance with Podemos and United Left/The Greens.

Composition
December 2021–April 2022

Since April 2022

Electoral performance

Parliament of Andalusia

Notes

References

2021 establishments in Andalusia
2022 disestablishments in Andalusia
Political parties established in 2021
Political parties disestablished in 2022
Defunct political parties in Spain
Political parties in Andalusia